The Rainbow Jacket is a 1954 British  drama film directed by Basil Dearden, and featuring Robert Morley, Kay Walsh, Bill Owen, Honor Blackman and Sid James. It was made at Ealing Studios produced by Michael Balcon and Michael Relph and shot in Technicolor. The film's sets were designed by the art director Thomas N. Morahan. Location shooting took place in London and at a variety of racecourse towns including Newmarket and Epsom. The film was released by General Film Distributors as a part of a long-term arrangement with Ealing.

Premise
A champion jockey, having forfeited his own career by taking a bribe, takes a young rider under his wing.

At a racetrack meeting banned former jockey Sam is checking the perimeter for illicit means of entry and a cheeky young boy, Georgie, shows him how to get in. Georgie show a penchant for horse riding and is befriended by Sam who encourages him to train as a jockey.

He is placed in the stables of Lord Logan at Newmarket. He shows much promise and Sam bets £100 on him to win. Georgie is impressive but a photo finish shows he comes second. On his second race his mother steals £50 from her employer's safe and bets it on him to win. He comes first but a stewards’ inquiry wrongly disqualifies him and his mother loses the money.

On the third race and for his mother’s sake, Sam persuades Georgie to take a fall to throw the race but when Sam visits in the first aid area their connection is exposed. Sam faces another ban but Georgie’s staunch defence of his character to the stewards eventually leads to Sam having his license renewed.

But in the final classic of the season, the St Leger, the two are neck and neck and Sam clearly whips Georgie’s horse to urge it on and to win. He does this because he has realized that Georgie threw the previous race to avoid implicating Sam.

Sam’s actions of course mean he is finally banned from racing and after a final piece of illicit betting he retires to live with Georgie’s widowed mother and all is right with the racing world.

Cast

 Fella Edmonds as Georgie Crain
 Kay Walsh as Barbara Crain
 Bill Owen as Sam
 Edward Underdown as Geoffrey Tyler
 Robert Morley as Lord Logan
 Honor Blackman as Mrs Tyler
 Charles Victor as Mr Voss
 Wilfrid Hyde-White as Lord Stoneleigh
 Ronald Ward as Bernie Rudd
 Howard Marion-Crawford as Travers
 Sid James as Harry
 Michael Trubshawe as Gresham
 Sam Kydd as Bruce
 Colin Kemball as 	Archie Stevens
 Michael Ripper as Benny Loder
 Frederick Piper as Lukey
 Herbert C. Walton as 	Adams
 George Thorpe as	Ross
 Eliot Makeham as Valet
 Brian Roper as Ron Saunders
 Bernard Lee as Racketeer
 Glyn Houston as Security Man at Stables
 Katie Johnson as Sports Paper Reader on Train 
 Raymond Glendenning as Racing Commentator 
 Gordon Richards cameo as a jockey

Reception
The film premiered at the Odeon Leicester Square in London on 27 May 1954, and the reviewer for The Times wrote that, "It is, then, an entertaining film, a film in love with racing and yet not quite so devotedly so as to refrain from suggesting that in the running of the St. Leger there can be some very queer goings-on indeed."

Sixty years after the premiere, TV Guide felt that "a trite outcome mars this fairly entertaining film, which features real-life British racing figures Raymond Glendenning and Gordon Richards" while Time Out noted that the film was "the first collaboration between Dearden and TEB Clarke after The Blue Lamp...Despite its intriguing subject, the film offers little but the cosy, sentimental view of life that is typical of late Ealing films."

References

External links
 
 
 

1954 films
1950s sports drama films
British sports drama films
Ealing Studios films
Films directed by Basil Dearden
British horse racing films
Films scored by William Alwyn
Films set in London
Films shot in London
Films shot in Suffolk
1954 drama films
1950s English-language films
1950s British films